McDonald v Coys of Kensington (Sales) Ltd [2004] EWCA Civ 47 is an English unjust enrichment law case, concerning the nature of an enrichment.

Facts
Coys of Kensington, an auctioneer, had sold a Mercedes 280 SL to Mr McDonald for £20,290. However, Coys mistakenly included the personalised number plate (TAC 1). This alone was worth £15,000. Mr McDonald became statutorily entitled to it and he registered it in his name. Coys compensated the car’s former owners with £13,608, Mr and Mrs Cressman, who were executors for the late Mr T A Cressman for the loss of the numberplate. Coys then sought a 100% contribution from Mr McDonald plus the remaining £1392 as assignees of the Cressmans’ cause of action.

Judgment
Mance LJ held that the full £15,000 could be recovered from Mr McDonald. He was unjustly enriched, and it was not important that this was connected to the statutory scheme for registration of number plates.

See also

English unjust enrichment law

Notes

References

English unjust enrichment case law
Court of Appeal (England and Wales) cases
2004 in case law
2004 in British law